The House of Keys is the directly elected lower house of Tynwald, the parliament of the Isle of Man, the other branch being the Legislative Council.

History 

There is a dispute, however, over the origin of the name. The word keys is thought by some to be an English corruption of a form of the Norse verb  ('to choose'). However, a more likely explanation is that it is a mishearing of the Manx-language term for 'four and twenty':  , the House having always had 24 members. The Manx-language name of the House remains  ('The Four and Twenty').

Governance 
Members are known as Members of the House of Keys (MHKs). Citizens over the age of 16 may vote, while one must be at least 18 years old and a resident of the Island for three years to be elected an MHK. There are 12 constituencies, mainly based on the sheadings and on local government units. (A few local government units are split between two constituencies.) Each sends two members to the House of Keys, elected by plurality voting (each elector can vote for up to two candidates). The term of the House of Keys is normally fixed at five years, but provisions exist for dissolution before the expiration of the term.

The Speaker of the House of Keys (SHK) is an MHK elected by the Keys as the presiding officer. The Speaker votes in the House of Keys, but, unlike other members, may abstain; however, when the vote is tied the Speaker must cast the deciding vote. The Speaker also acts as Deputy President of Tynwald Court.

The House of Keys elects 8 of the 11 members of the Legislative Council. Legislation does not usually originate in the council. (There are exceptions: for example the Equality Bill was introduced in the Legislative Council in late 2016.) Thus, the Keys have much more power than the council, which performs the function of a revising chamber.

The House of Keys meets about once each month together with the Legislative Council in a joint session called Tynwald Court. During the COVID pandemic, these meetings have been more frequent. The President of Tynwald, elected by both branches, presides over Tynwald Court and over the Legislative Council. Once each year, however, on Tynwald Day, the Isle of Man's national day, the Lieutenant Governor presides.

Meeting place 
The House of Keys usually meets in their chamber in the Legislative Buildings in Douglas. Seating is allocated in alphabetical order by constituency name (in English) and organised into two rows. Members who received the highest number of votes in their constituency sit in the front row. On 14 March 2017 the Keys met in the Old House of Keys in Castletown, for the first time since 1874, to commemorate the sesquicentenary of the first elected House of Keys. During the COVID pandemic, these meetings have sometimes been held remotely.

Elections

Membership

References

External links 

 House of Keys
 Elections to the House (Dead Link)
 Enfranchisement @ 16 years (BBC)
 iomelections.com – 2006 General Election
 Access to work & info of members of IoM Tynwald
  (The last paragraph of this article speculates on the origins of the name "House of Keys").

Tynwald
National lower houses